The British Columbia Council on Admissions and Transfer (BCCAT) governs the credit-transfer agreements between post-secondary institutions in British Columbia, Canada.

External links
http://www.bccat.bc.ca - official website

Educational organizations based in British Columbia